Enregistrement Public à l'Olympia 1961 is Jacques Brel's first live album. Also known as A L'Olympia (Philips 6416 403), the album was reissued on 23 September 2003 under the title Enregistrement Public à l'Olympia 1961 as part of the 16-CD box set Boîte à Bonbons by Barclay (980 816-8).

Track listing 
All tracks composed by Jacques Brel, except where noted.
 "Les prénoms de Paris" (Brel, Gérard Jouannest)
 "Les bourgeois" (Brel, Jean Corti)
 "Les paumés du petit matin" (Brel, François Rauber)
 "Les Flamandes"
 "La statue" (Brel, Rauber)
 "Zangra"
 "Marieke" (Brel, Jouannest)
 "Les biches" (Brel, Jouannest)
 "Madeleine" (Brel, Jouannest, Corti)
 "Les singes" 
 "L’Ivrogne" (Brel, Jouannest, Rauber)
 "La valse à mille temps" 
 "Ne me quitte pas" 
 "Le Moribond" 
 "Quand on n'a que l'amour"

Credits 

 Gérard Jouannest – piano
 François Rauber – piano
 Jean Corti – accordion
 Daniel Janin – orchestra conductor

References 

Jacques Brel albums
Albums recorded at the Olympia (Paris)
1962 live albums
Philips Records live albums
Barclay (record label) live albums
Universal Records live albums
French-language live albums